Tracy's Landing Tobacco House No. 2 is a historic tobacco barn at Tracy's Landing, Anne Arundel County, Maryland.  It is a 24’3" by 45’2" heavy timber framed tobacco barn with a construction date of 1805.  It is the earliest identified tobacco house extant in Anne Arundel County, and is one of the earliest recorded examples of this type of agricultural building in Tidewater Maryland.

It was listed on the National Register of Historic Places in 1982.

References

External links
, including photo from 1980, at Maryland Historical Trust

Buildings and structures in Anne Arundel County, Maryland
Agricultural buildings and structures on the National Register of Historic Places in Maryland
Agricultural buildings and structures on the National Register of Historic Places
National Register of Historic Places in Anne Arundel County, Maryland
Tobacco barns
Tobacco buildings in the United States
1805 establishments in Maryland
Commercial buildings completed in 1805